Peter Tiberio (born April 26, 1989) is an American rugby union player who plays for the Seattle Seawolves in Major League Rugby (MLR).

At 5'11", 180 lbs, he plays wing for the United States national rugby sevens team and has represented the United States in the IRB Sevens World Series.  Tiberio first represented the U.S. in the IRB Sevens circuit at the Hong Kong Sevens in March 2011. Tiberio also represented the United States at the 2011 Pan American Games, where Tiberio and his teammates earned a bronze medal.

College & youth career
Tiberio first rose to national prominence in his college playing days with the University of Arizona Wildcats, even though he did not take up the sport of rugby until he was a freshman in college. Tiberio was named to the All-American team three years in a row.  Rugby Mag named Tiberio as its 2011 College 7s Player of the Year. Tiberio starred for Arizona during the 2011 Collegiate Rugby Championship, which was broadcast live on NBC.  Tiberio led all players with eight tries scored in that tournament, and was named to the All Tournament Team.

Tiberio played center for the United States at the 2009 IRB Junior World Rugby Trophy competition in Nairobi, Kenya.

See also
 United States national rugby sevens team
 IRB Sevens World Series
 Collegiate Rugby Championship
 United States national under-20 rugby union team

References

American rugby union players
1989 births
University of Arizona alumni
United States international rugby union players
Living people
United States international rugby sevens players
Pan American Games medalists in rugby sevens
Pan American Games bronze medalists for the United States
Seattle Seawolves players
Rugby sevens players at the 2011 Pan American Games
Medalists at the 2011 Pan American Games